Warren Hunt may refer to:

 Warren Hunt (footballer) (born 1984), English professional footballer
 Warren Hunt (bishop) (1909–1994), inaugural Bishop of Repton, 1965–1977